The World Is Ours may refer to:

 The World Is Ours (Farmer Boys album), 2000
 The World Is Ours (Upon a Burning Body album), 2010
 The World Is Ours (film), a 1937 Czech film directed by Martin Frič
 Coca-Cola's theme song for the 2014 FIFA World Cup